Jorge Abner Drexler Prada (born September 21, 1964) is a Uruguayan musician, actor and doctor specializing in otolaryngology.

In 2004, Drexler won wide acclaim after becoming the first Uruguayan to win an Academy Award, which he won for composing the song "Al Otro Lado del Río" from The Motorcycle Diaries.

Early life
Drexler was born in Montevideo. In 1939 his father, a German Jew from Berlin, fled to Uruguay with his family at the age of four to escape Nazi persecution. His mother is a Christian of mixed Spanish, French, and Portuguese descent.  Drexler was raised Jewish, but does not follow any organized religion.

Like many of his family, he studied medicine and became an otorhinolaryngologist—an ear, nose and throat specialist.  Drexler began playing piano at age five, before attending guitar and composition classes.  Although he had an interest in music, he became a doctor like both of his parents.  He attended medical school in Montevideo.  During his time in medical school, Drexler took a break to hitchhike through Brazil. He also studied music and recorded two albums, which were only released in Uruguay.

Career

In 1995 he was invited to Madrid by well-known Spanish songwriter Joaquín Sabina, who introduced him to other important Spanish singers. Drexler went to Spain to record the album Vaivén in 1996 with Spanish musicians. Vaivén included some old songs from his previous releases mixed with new compositions. He moved to Spain and recorded another four albums: Llueve (1997), Frontera (1999), Sea (2001) and Eco (2004). In 2001, Drexler co-wrote two songs for Spanish singer Rosario Flores ("Agua y Sal" and "Rosa y Miel") for her album Muchas Flores.

Drexler's song "Al Otro Lado del Río" appeared in the internationally acclaimed film The Motorcycle Diaries. Though Drexler himself sang the song on the movie soundtrack, he was not allowed to perform the song at the 2005 Academy Awards, since "he was not popular enough," according to Spanish newspaper El País; Spanish actor Antonio Banderas and Mexican-American musician Carlos Santana sang the track instead. Upon winning, Drexler recited two verses of the song at the podium. Drexler became the first Uruguayan to win an Academy Award.

After that, he released 12 Segundos de Oscuridad (2006); this album contained ten original songs and two covers: "High and Dry" from British band Radiohead and "Disneylandia" from Brazilian Titãs. Although he lives most of the year in Spain, his albums were partially recorded in Uruguay with Uruguayan musicians. Juan Campodónico and Carlos Casacuberta, former members of rock band El Peyote Asesino, had produced Drexler's albums from Frontera to 12 Segundos De Oscuridad. In 2008, he released a double live album, recorded in diverse concerts in Spain: Cara B (2008), mainly filled with songs previously unreleased. During 2009, Drexler worked with Colombian performer Shakira on the Spanish-language versions of her singles "She Wolf", "Did it Again" and "Waka Waka (This Time for Africa).

Drexler recorded Amar la Trama (2010) from November 1–4, 2009 in Madrid, Spain in just four days, with musicians playing live on studio. Drexler described the album as playful, without "the melancholy and anguish" of 12 Segundos. Amar la Trama was recorded in a television studio in front of a small audience who were selected in an online contest. He chose this format to avoid the "coldness" of the recording studio.

His album Bailar en la Cueva, released in 2014, shows a new facet of the artist leaning towards rhythm and dance, a contrast to his previous albums which he describes as more introspective and nostalgic. In particular, he has pointed out that it is a very different album to the last one, describing it as the opposite pole to "Amar la Trama".

In 2017, he released Salvavidas de Hielo, an album of increased musical, if not lyrical, complexity. In this album, Drexler set out to explore the limits of the guitar, using that instrument alone (or the human voice) for every sound on the album (including percussion).

Tinta y Tiempo was released in 2022. In many ways, this was Drexler's most challenging album, as the pandemic made it difficult for him to compose. In particular, he struggled to complete songs without being able to play them for others. At times, he questioned whether or not he would be able to finish the album without these crucial interactions. As the pandemic eased, however, and society slowly reopened, he was able to reconnect with the public and finish the album. One of the themes of this album is experiencing life, love, and the world in general with fresh eyes, a message that resonates most strongly in his hit song Cinturón Blanco.

His music is a combination of Uruguayan traditional music (candombe, murga, milonga, tango), bossa nova, pop, jazz and electronic music, which results in very personal compositions with original arrangements. The words also play an important role in his songs. Apart from love, reflections about identity, race and religions are a constant in his work.

Personal life
Drexler was previously married to singer-songwriter Ana Laan. His girlfriend is Spanish actress/singer Leonor Watling, with whom he has two children.  Watling is in the band Marlango. His cousin is the scientist Alejandra Melfo.

Awards and nominations

Aside from his Academy Award for Best Original Song, Drexler has been nominated five times at the Grammy Awards, for the albums Eco (2004), 12 Segundos de Oscuridad (2006), Cara B (2008), Bailar en la Cueva (2014), and Salvavidas de Hielo (2017); and received five Latin Grammy Awards, twice for Best Singer-Songwriter Album and Record of the Year and one for Song of the Year. For his work writing Spanish-language versions of singles by Colombian singer-songwriter Shakira, he has received five ASCAP Latin Awards. Drexler also received a Goya Award in 2010 with the song "Que El Soneto Nos Tome Por Sorpresa", written for the Spanish film Lope; the same year he was named Commander of the Order of Isabella the Catholic for his musical contributions. Overall, Drexler has received 13 awards from 46 nominations.
In November 2018, Drexler took home record of the year and the song of the year for "Telefonía" and the best singer-songwriter album for Salvavidas de Hielo at the Latin Grammys 2018.

Discography
La Luz Que Sabe Robar (Ayui, 1992)
Radar (Ayui, 1994)
Vaivén (Virgin, 1996)
Llueve (Virgin, 1997)
Frontera (Virgin, 1999)
Sea (Virgin, 2001)
Eco (Warner, 2004)
12 Segundos de Oscuridad (Warner, 2006)
La Edad del Cielo (Warner, 2007)
Cara B (Warner, 2008)
Amar la Trama (Warner, 2010)
Bailar en la Cueva (Warner, 2014)
Salvavidas de Hielo (Warner, 2017)
30 Años (Warner, 2021)
Tinta y tiempo (Warner, 2022)

References 

1964 births
Living people
Best Original Song Academy Award-winning songwriters
Latin Grammy Award winners
Latin music songwriters
Male film score composers
Male songwriters
Recipients of the Order of Isabella the Catholic
Singers from Montevideo
Uruguayan expatriates in Spain
Uruguayan film score composers
Uruguayan Jews
Uruguayan people of French descent
Uruguayan people of German-Jewish descent
Uruguayan people of Portuguese descent
Uruguayan people of Spanish descent
Uruguayan pop singers
Uruguayan otorhinolaryngologists
Uruguayan songwriters
Warner Music Latina artists
20th-century Uruguayan male singers
21st-century Uruguayan male singers
Jewish otolaryngologists